is a type of Japanese pottery traditionally made in Mashiko, Tochigi.

Early pottery in Mashiko dates back to the Jōmon and Yayoi periods. Mashikoyaki is often thought of as simple and rustic in style, with brown and maybe a little red glaze, but modern pottery made in Mashiko today is found in many styles, on account of the creative freedom brought to Mashiko by Shoji Hamada. Modern Mashikoyaki dates only to 1853, when a potter discovered that local clay here was ideal for ceramics.  The style was popularized in 1930 when Hamada, later designated as a Living National Treasure, set up a kiln in Mashiko. Hamada's student, Tatsuzō Shimaoka, was also designated as a Living National Treasure and worked in Mashiko from 1953 until his death in 2007.

Mashiko is a folkware kiln site that is unlike some of the other older kiln sites around Japan. The town is open to newcomers whether or not they are potters or of other professional backgrounds in arts, sciences and education. In Japan, craftsmen are usually born into their profession, but in Mashiko, anyone can become a potter. Following Shoji Hamada, people looking to return to a more traditional Japanese lifestyle settled in the area.

Twice a year, coinciding with the Golden Week Holidays in the first week of May, and again for the first week of November, there is a pottery and crafts festival where potters and craftsmen from Mashiko and surrounding areas come to the town and set up stalls.

See also 
 Meibutsu
 Mingei

References

External links 

 Mashiko Pottery Mashiko town tourist association

Culture in Tochigi Prefecture
Japanese pottery
Mashiko, Tochigi